San Jose, officially the Municipality of San Jose,  is a 3rd class municipality in the province of Tarlac, Philippines. According to the 2020 census, it has a population of 41,182 people.

It was created into a municipality pursuant to Republic Act No. 6842, ratified on April 21, 1990; taken from the municipality of Tarlac.

It is also the largest municipality of the province in terms of land area. Monasterio de Tarlac is located in this municipality.

Geography

Barangays
San Jose is politically subdivided into 13 barangays:

 Burgos
 David
 Iba 
 Labney
 Lawacamulag
 Lubigan
 Maamot
 Mababanaba
 Moriones
 Pao
 San Juan de Valdez
 Sula
 Villa Aglipay

Climate

Demographics

Economy

References

External links

San Jose Profile at PhilAtlas.com
[ Philippine Standard Geographic Code]
Philippine Census Information

Municipalities of Tarlac